Ablaevo (Ablay) is a rural locality (a selo) in Kakrybashevsky Selsoviet of Tuymazinsky District, Bashkortostan, Russia. The population was 315 as of 2010. There are 2 streets.

Geography 
Ablaevo is located 21 km north of Tuymazy (the district's administrative centre) by road. Tukmak-Karan and Stary Karazerik are the nearest rural localities.

Ethnicity 
The village is inhabited by Bashkirs, Tatars and others.

References 

Rural localities in Tuymazinsky District